SP-423  is a state highway in the state of São Paulo in Brazil.

Also known as Luiz Highway Delbem, the SP-423 highway passes through the municipalities of Nova Granada and Palestina.

References

Highways in São Paulo (state)